The Kravica is a short river in Bratunac, Republic of Srpska, Bosnia and Herzegovina. It is located in the Drina basin. The river starts in the Konjevići and flows into the Jadar river, a tributary of Drinjača, in Ježeštica.

History 
During the 2014 Southeast Europe floods, some of the bridges on the river had collapsed under a torrent of water.

Notes

References 

Rivers of Bosnia and Herzegovina